The 2008 D.C. United season was the fourteenth year of the club's existence, as well as their thirteenth season in Major League Soccer and their thirteenth consecutive season in the top tier of the American soccer pyramid.

To fans and the media alike, this year marked a downfall for the franchise, as well as end to what was considered a "second golden age" for the club in league play. The justification behind this involved the United failing to defend the Supporters' Shield, an awarded given to the MLS club with the best regular season record, for a third-consecutive year. With a 10th-place overall finish and a 6th-place finish in the Eastern Conference, United finished the lowest in the conference and league tables since 2002. With the subpar record, United failed to make the playoffs, having qualified since 2003.

Their performance league play reflected on the continental stage as well. Finishing as the 2007 MLS Supporters' Shield winners, United qualified for the inaugural CONCACAF Champions League. The tournament replaced the obsolete CONCACAF Champions' Cup, and was modeled similarly to its cousin tournament, the UEFA Champions League. In the Champions League, United continued their misfortunes, losing all their Group Stage matches at home, and only managing to pick up one draw at Costa Rica's Saprissa. United finished in the bottom of Group C, with a record of 0–1–5 (W-T-L).

In spite of the poorer performance in league and continental play, United excelled in the U.S. Open Cup play, ultimately winning the domestic title against Charleston Battery, 2–1. The domestic cup title was their first since their inaugural season. The U.S. Open Cup, a domestic cup tournament much similar to the FA Cup runs parallel to the regular seasons of all tiers of professional and amateur soccer in the United States. The tournament is open for entry for any soccer club, professional or amateur, that is affiliated with the United States Soccer Federation. For MLS clubs, the top six American MLS clubs overall in the regular season are admitted entry into the third round proper, or round of 16, in the tournament. By finishing 1st overall in the regular season, United booked a third round entry in the tournament proper. The club opened Open Cup play with wins against Rochester Rhinos of the USL First Division (second tier) and New England Revolution of MLS (first tier) in the third round and quarterfinals respectively. In the semifinals, United won in extra time to defeat Chicago Fire. In the championship, United defeated Charleston Battery of the USL Second Division (third tier) to win the Open Cup for a second time in club history.

Club

2008 roster

Transfers

In

Loan

In

Standings

Major League Soccer 
Conference Standings

Overall Table

CONCACAF Champions League 
Group A

Match results

MLS

CONCACAF Champions' Cup

CONCACAF Champions League

U.S. Open Cup

References

2008
Dc United
Dc United
2008 in sports in Washington, D.C.
U.S. Open Cup champion seasons